Chiens errants (English: Wandering Dogs) is a 1995 short film directed by Yasmine Kassari. It was screened at multiple international film festivals including the London and Sydney film festivals, the Bruxelles International Film Festival, and the International Francophone Film Festival of Namur, where it won a prize for Best Short Film.

Synopsis 
The culling of stray dogs is a regular occurrence in certain Moroccan cities. On the dreaded day of the cull, every dog owner keeps their pet at home. The killers are confronted by those without a roof: a shepherdess and a tramp.

Awards and accolades 

 1995 International Francophone Film Festival of Namur (CIRTEF Prize for Best Short Film)
 1996 Turin Film Festival (Best Short Film)
 1997 Milan Festival of African Cinema (Special Jury Mention)

References

External links 
 

Belgian short documentary films
1996 short films
Feral dogs
Moroccan Arabic